Jyotsna Biswas is a Bangladeshi stage actress specialized in jatra pala genre. She was awarded Ekushey Padak in 2011 by the Government of Bangladesh.

Personal life
Biswas was married to Amalendu Biswas. Amalendu was also an Ekushey Padak winning jatra actor. Together they have a daughter, Aruna Biswas who is an actress and television drama director.

References

Living people
Bengali Hindus
Bangladeshi Hindus
Bangladeshi stage actresses
Recipients of the Ekushey Padak
Year of birth missing (living people)
Place of birth missing (living people)